Sphaerophysa is a genus of flowering plants in the family Fabaceae. It belongs to the subfamily Faboideae.

The species distributed from West Asia, Central Asia, Siberia and East Asia. There are two species:
 Sphaerophysa kotschyana is a sensitive plant endemic to Central Anatolia.
 Sphaerophysa salsula, on the other hand, is an Asian plant that is well known on other continents as an introduced species and sometimes a weed.

References

External links

Galegeae
Fabaceae genera